Geirton Marques Aires (born 28 January 1994), commonly known as Gegê, is a Brazilian footballer who plays as an attacking midfielder for Londrina.

Hornous
Botafogo
 Campeonato Carioca: 2013
 Taça Guanabara: 2015
 Campeonato Brasileiro Série B: 2015

ABC
 Copa RN: 2017
 Campeonato Potiguar: 2017

Avaí
Campeonato Catarinense: 2019

References

External links

1994 births
Living people
Sportspeople from Ceará
Brazilian footballers
Brazilian expatriate footballers
Association football midfielders
Botafogo de Futebol e Regatas players
ABC Futebol Clube players
Avaí FC players
Adana Demirspor footballers
Grêmio Esportivo Brasil players
Esporte Clube Santo André players
Campeonato Brasileiro Série A players
Campeonato Brasileiro Série B players
TFF First League players
Brazilian expatriate sportspeople in Turkey
Expatriate footballers in Turkey